Prince of Mexico may refer to:

1st Mexican Empire
 Prince Imperial of Mexico, a title created after Mexico gained independence from the Spanish Empire as the official title of the heir apparent to the imperial throne of Mexico
 Princess of Iturbide, a title created for the older sister of the 1st Emperor of Mexico.
 Prince of the Union, a title created for the father of the 1st Emperor of Mexico. Don José Joaquín de Iturbide y Arreguí
 Mexican Prince, the title created for the legitimate sons and daughters of Agustín de Iturbide, 1st Emperor of Mexico

2nd Mexican Empire
 Princess of Iturbide, a title restored to designate to the daughter alive of Agustín de Iturbide
 Prince of Iturbide, a title created to designate to the grandsons of the 1st Emperor of Mexico adopted by Maximilian of Mexico